The Parkstein, also called the Hoher Parkstein and Basaltkegel Hoher Parkstein is a well-known local hill and tourist destination in the Steinwald Mountains of central Germany. At one time a castle (Parkstein Castle) stood on the summit.

The Parkstein is famous for its impressive basalt outcrop. This basalt formation consists of pentagonal and hexagonal columns, up to one metre high, whose shafts extend into the earth to a depth of up to 30 metres. It is part of an old stream of lava that has been exposed at the surface after the softer rock above it had been weathered away over the course of millions of years. The wall of basalt measures 38 metres.

Alexander von Humboldt viewed the Parkstein as the "most beautiful basalt cone in Europe".

In 2004 it was entered by the Free State of Bavaria as No. 20 on the list of the 100 "most beautiful geotopes in Bavaria".

External links 

Hoher Parkstein at Geopark Bayern 
Detailed description of the geotope on the home page of VFMG Weiden 

Hills of Bavaria
Neustadt an der Waldnaab (district)
South German Scarplands